CPCCOEt is a drug used in scientific research, which acts as a non-competitive antagonist at the metabotropic glutamate receptor subtype mGluR1, with high selectivity although only moderate binding affinity. It is used mainly in basic research into the function of the mGluR1 receptor, including the study of behavioural effects in animals including effects on memory and addiction.

See also
 PHCCC

References

MGlu1 receptor antagonists
Benzopyrans
Ethyl esters
Cyclopropanes
Ketoximes